State Route 110 (SR 110) is a short state highway in southwestern Maine, located entirely within the town of Newfield.  Route 110 begins in the west at the New Hampshire state line less than a half-mile from New Hampshire Route 153, which connects via unnumbered Stevens Corner Road.  The eastern terminus is located 3.6 miles east at an intersection with State Route 11 near Rock Haven Lake.

Route description
State Route 110 begins at the New Hampshire state line between Newfield, Maine and Wakefield, New Hampshire approximately 0.5 miles east of NH 153, and runs due east for 3.6 miles through West Newfield until intersecting and ending at an intersection with SR 11.  SR 110 is called Wakefield Road over its entire length.

Western terminus
Although the connecting road to NH 153 is unnumbered, the road is maintained by NHDOT, and junction signage for SR 110 is present on NH 153 (with Maine-style shield, since New Hampshire has its own Route 110 which is unrelated).  An eastbound reassurance shield for SR 110 is also present on the New Hampshire side; however, westbound signage clearly indicates the end of the route at the state line.  Many maps erroneously depict SR 110 extending all the way to NH 153.

History
When it was designated in 1925, SR 110 was a much longer route than it is today, stretching from Alfred to Limington. It went under major changes in 1931, with its western terminus being shifted to the New Hampshire state line and all of its eastern routing becoming part of modern SR 4, SR 5, SR 11, and U.S. Route 202, resulting in the short alignment it has today.

Junction list

References

110
Transportation in York County, Maine
U.S. Route 202